Donta Scott (born December 4, 2000) is an American college basketball player for the Maryland Terrapins of the Big Ten Conference.

High school career
Scott attended Imhotep Institute Charter High School in Philadelphia. He played multiple positions and moved to point guard after the departure of Fatts Russell. Scott helped his team win three straight Philadelphia Public League and Class 4A state titles. He was a two-time Class 4A Player of the Year. He committed to playing college basketball for Maryland over offers from La Salle, Temple, Seton Hall and South Carolina.

College career
Scott entered Maryland's starting lineup by mid-December of his freshman season. As a freshman, he averaged 5.9 points and 3.6 rebounds per game. During his sophomore season, Scott emerged as one of his team's best players, improving his shooting ability. He averaged 11 points and 5.9 rebounds per game, shooting 48.8 percent from the field.

Career statistics

College

|-
| style="text-align:left;"| 2019–20
| style="text-align:left;"| Maryland
| 31 || 21 || 21.6 || .439 || .316 || .846 || 3.6 || .5 || .5 || .1 || 5.9
|-
| style="text-align:left;"| 2020–21
| style="text-align:left;"| Maryland
| 31 || 27 || 30.3 || .498 || .438 || .663 || 5.9 || 2.0 || .7 || .8 || 11.0
|- class="sortbottom"
| style="text-align:center;" colspan="2"| Career
| 62 || 48 || 26.0 || .474 || .387 || .706 || 4.8 || 1.3 || .6 || .5 || 8.4

References

External links
Maryland Terrapins bio

2000 births
Living people
American men's basketball players
Basketball players from Philadelphia
Maryland Terrapins men's basketball players
Small forwards